This is a list of presidents of the English College, Douai.

Notes

Douai